is a song by Japanese rock band Asian Kung-Fu Generation. It was released as the lead single of their second full-length studio album, Sol-fa, on April 4, 2004. With the band's then-newly emerging popularity, the single managed to debut at number two on the Oricon charts. Although the song's B-side, "Siren#," shares a nearly identical title with the single, the two are somewhat different from each other. While both retain the same instrumental, the lyrics and melody of "Siren#" are different from that of "Siren." In a sense, "Siren#" can be considered a continuation or a remix of its A-side.

Music video
The music video for "Siren" and "Siren#" were directed by Toshiaki Toyoda. The video presented a sweeping tour past a suspension bridge and through a city by translucent astral projections of the band. As the end of the song, Masafumi Gotoh walk toward the camera, put his hand in front of it and then he slowly disappeared. For "Siren#", the video presented in the same way as Siren, but with different scenes. The Siren# video ends with Gotoh followed by other members exit from film set.

Track listing

Personnel
Masafumi Gotoh – lead vocals, rhythm guitar
Kensuke Kita – lead guitar, background vocals
Takahiro Yamada –  bass, background vocals
Kiyoshi Ijichi – drums
Asian Kung-Fu Generation – producer
Tohru Takayama – mixing
Mitsuharu Harada – mastering
Kenichi Nakamura – recording
Yusuke Nakamura – single cover art

Charts

References

Asian Kung-Fu Generation songs
2004 singles
Songs written by Masafumi Gotoh
Songs written by Takahiro Yamada (musician)
2004 songs
Ki/oon Music singles